Redhill (formerly Broughton) is a town in the Mid North of South Australia adjacent to the Broughton River.

Governance 
Redhill is in the Port Pirie Regional Council local government area, the South Australian House of Assembly electoral district of Frome and the Australian House of Representatives Division of Grey.

History
Redhill was established in the late nineteenth century under the name of Broughton, with a hotel, blacksmith, general store and other businesses built within the township. A primary school operated in the town for many years. Several churches were also built in the township and there is also a cemetery on the town's south eastern outskirts. The town now has a small museum opposite the hotel (Eureka Hotel), located in the former District Council of Redhill offices.

It was renamed as Redhill in 1940, but was known by that name well before then.

The Redhill Geological Site on the Redhill to Yacka Road is listed on the South Australian Heritage Register.

Transport 
Redhill was for many years the terminus of a broad gauge branch railway (now the southern part of the Adelaide-Port Augusta railway line) which was meant to continue to Port Pirie to connect directly with the standard gauge Trans-Australian Railway. The link was completed in 1938, resulting in a rare triple gauge yard. In the 1980s, when more lines were converted to standard gauge, the Redhill line was diverted to Crystal Brook.

The Princes Highway bypasses the town with a petrol station situated between the road and the township.

References

Towns in South Australia
Mid North (South Australia)